HMS J7 (later HMAS J7) was a J-class submarine operated by the Royal Navy and the Royal Australian Navy.

Design and construction

The submarines had a displacement of 1,210 tons surfaced, but J7 had a lighter submerged displacement than her sister boats, at 1,760 tons. The propulsion system was built around three propeller shafts; the J-class were the only triple-screwed submarines ever built by the British. Propulsion came from three 12-cylinder diesel motors when on the surface, and electric motors when submerged.

Armament consisted of six 18 inch (450 mm) torpedo tubes (four forward, one on each beam), plus a 4-inch deck gun. Originally, the gun was mounted on a breastwork fitted forward of the conning tower, but the breastwork was later extended to the bow and merged into the hull for streamlining, and the gun was relocated to a platform fitted to the front of the conning tower. The conning tower on J7 was sited  further back than her sister boats, as the control room was located behind the machinery spaces. 44 personnel were aboard.

J7 was built by HM Dockyard Devonport in Plymouth and launched on 12 February 1917.

Operational history
After the war, the British Admiralty decided that the best way to protect the Pacific region was with a force of submarines and cruisers. To this end, they offered the six surviving submarines of the J-class to the Royal Australian Navy as gifts. The flotilla reached Thursday Island on 29 June, and Sydney on 10 July. Because of the submarines' condition after the long voyage, they were immediately taken out of service for refits.

By the time J7 was returned to service in June 1922, the cost of maintaining the boats and deteriorating economic conditions saw the six submarines decommissioned and marked for disposal.

Fate

J7 was paid off on 12 July 1922, and was sold on 26 February 1924. The hulk was scuttled in 1930, for use as a breakwater at the Sandringham yacht club in Port Phillip. Some years later a stone marina was constructed around the wreck, which was left in situ and visible, being too expensive to remove, where it continues to deteriorate.

Citations

References

External links
 Map of Sandringham yacht club marina 

British J-class submarines
Ships built in Plymouth, Devon
1917 ships
World War I submarines of the United Kingdom
Scuttled vessels of Australia
Royal Navy ship names
Shipwrecks of Victoria (Australia)